Tanya Berezin (born March 25, 1941) is an American actress, co-founder and an artistic director of Circle Repertory Company in New York City, and educator. She has performed on Broadway and Off-Broadway, and has also appeared in a number of films and television series.

Early life and education
Berezin was born in Philadelphia, Pennsylvania on March 25, 1941. She attended Boston University College of Fine Arts, where her roommate was Faye Dunaway. In the 1960s she trained with acting teacher, Jim Tuttle, in the Meisner Technique. In 1963, she arrived in New York and began performing.

While performing in summer stock she met and married Rob Thirkield, who introduced her to experimental theaters in New York, including  La MaMa Experimental Theatre Club and Caffe Cino. Thirkield also introduced her to two others would play important roles in her life, Marshall W. Mason and Lanford Wilson. She was divorced from Thirkield in 1977, and she married actor Mark Wilson in 1987.

At La Mama in the 1960s she appeared in several plays, including Lanford Wilson's first full-length play, Rimers of Eldrige, which was directed by the author, and also featured Michael Warren Powell; and Spring Play, by William M. Hoffman, which also featured Harvey Keitel; and The Sand Castle, or There is a Tavern in the Town, or Harry can Dance, also by Lanford Wilson, and directed by Marshall Mason.

Circle Repertory Company
In 1969, Berezin co-founded the Circle Repertory Company, along with Wilson, Mason, and Thirkield. It began (as the Circle Theater Company) in a loft on Broadway on the Upper West Side of Manhattan. Thirkield, an heir to the Thomas Leeming Company (a pharmaceutical company), contributed generously to support Circle Rep until his death in July 1986. The theatre has helped to develop many actors, directors, and playwrights. While she was artistic director from 1987 to 1994, the theatre premiered plays written by Craig Lucas, Larry Kramer, Jim Leonard, Paula Vogel, Jon Robin Baitz, and others. As artistic director of Circle Rep Berezin produced Pulitzer Prize winning playwright Paula Vogel’s first play, The Baltimore Waltz; Vogel described that experience, and said "I would not exist if it weren't for Tanya Berezin."

Describing the role of an artistic director, she has said, “An artistic director basically does two things. One is giving careful attention to each project, finding the right director for the play and having some idea of casting...The other part is having the vision to know that someone might be a really exciting playwright four or five years from now and giving him or her the platform now - to invest in someone, to take chances.” She was devoted to Circle Rep's “Lab” — a protected artistic workshop environment, based on Caffe Cino, where playwrights, actors and directors would experiment and develop.

The company moved in 1974 to Sheridan Square in Greenwich Village, New York. It began there with a production of Tennessee Williams' first full-length play, Battle of Angels, which starred Berezin. Reviewing that production in The New York Times, Walter Kerr wrote, "Miss Berezin is a revelation...The apparent contradictions of the role bleed into one another so subtly that you are not quite aware of the moment that this caged soul comes whole; but the whole person comes, ferocious, straight-laced, jealous, grateful...There is scarcely a finer performance in New York just now."Bottoms, Stephen, J. Playing Underground: A Critical History of the 1960s Off-off-Broadway Movement. University of Michigan Press (2006). . page 296 - 299.

Acting career

Broadway
As an actress she appeared on Broadway, in Master Class written by Terrence McNally, Prelude to a Kiss written by Craig Lucas, Gemini by Albert Innaurato, Knock Knock by Jules Feiffer, The Musical Comedy Murders of 1940 by John Bishop, As Is by William M. Hoffman; and in plays by Lanford Wilson including Redwood Curtain, Burn This, Angels Fall, Fifth of July, and Talley's Folly.

Of her performance in Landord Wilson's play Angels Fall, New York magazine said, "Tanya Berezin does a dazzling balancing act with superiority and edginess as the older woman to whom age brings both wisdom and insecurity; her performance is both lancet and whatever poultice there may be."

Off-Broadway
Her Off-Broadway appearances include Sympathetic Magic, The Mound Builders, Balm in Gilead, Battle of Angels, Serenading Louie, Caligua, The Beaver Coat, Mary Stuart, and other productions. Harold Clurman, reviewing Friedrich Schiller’s play Mary Stuart in The Nation said that a special note of praise was due "for Tanya Berezin as Queen Elizabeth, particularly in the moments of her steely calculations, dark resentments and self-determined and regal loneliness," and that her Queen Elizabeth was "depicted with incisive psychological understanding". In 1976, she won an Obie Award for her role in the premier production of Lanford Wilson's play The Mound Builders.

Film and television
She has appeared on television in Law & Order, Law & Order: Criminal Intent, Law & Order: Special Victims Unit, St. Elsewhere, Spenser: For Hire, The Equalizer, and others.  She also appeared in the films Awakenings, A Little Sex, He Said, She Said, and others.

Teaching and coaching
In 1994, Berezin began teaching and coaching actors for theatre, film, and television.

References

External links
 
 
 
 

American theatre directors
Women theatre directors
Obie Award recipients
1941 births
Living people
20th-century American actresses
21st-century American actresses
American film actresses
American soap opera actresses
American stage actresses
American television actresses
Actresses from Philadelphia
Actresses from New York City